Zyryansky (masculine), Zyryanskaya (feminine), or Zyryanskoye (neuter) may refer to:

Zyryansky District, a district of Tomsk Oblast, Russia
Zyryansky (inhabited locality) (Zyryanskaya, Zyryanskoye), several rural localities in Russia

See also
 Zyryanka